The Lad from Old Ireland, also called A Lad from Old Ireland, is a one-reel 1910 American motion picture directed by and starring Sidney Olcott and written by and co-starring Gene Gauntier. It was the first film appearance of prolific actor/director J.P. McGowan.

Production background
The film was the first ever production by an American movie studio to be filmed on location outside of the United States. Filming took place around Cork and Killarney in Ireland, and in New York City.

In August 1910, the Kalem Company of New York City sent director Sidney Olcott and a film crew to film in Europe. In Ireland, Olcott made The Lad From Old Ireland from a script written by Gene Gauntier. Shot by cinematographer George K. Hollister, the film was described in the publicity releases for its November premiere as "Kalem’s Great Trans-Atlantic Drama."

Laurene Santley doubles the Irish grandmother in the indoor sequence shot in the Kalem New York studio.

During that trip in Ireland Olcott shot a second film : The Irish Honeymoon.

Plot
An Irish boy (Olcott) emigrates to America to escape the desperate poverty of Ireland. After finding work in construction, he finds success in politics. He returns to Ireland after receiving a letter from his sweetheart (Gauntier) just as her destitute family is being forced off their land.

Cast
Sidney Olcott as Terry O'Connor
Gene Gauntier as Aileene
Thomas O'Connor as The landlord
Arthur Donaldson as Parish priest
J.P. McGowan as Election agent
Robert G. Vignola as Election agent
Jane Wolfe as Society woman
Laurene Santley doubles the Irish grandmother

Reception
The film was a critical and popular success, particularly with Irish immigrants in America. Unlike other films of the time, the Irish characters were not cartoonish caricatures, and the story was a familiar and hopeful one for immigrants. William Wright, Kalem's treasurer, recalled "Of that subject we sold in London alone 160 prints – a record-breaking achievement for a thousand-foot picture." The success prompted Kalem to send a larger company under the direction of Olcott the next year in 1911, which produced 18 films that summer.

The Moving Picture World noted that the film was "quite a success", but complained that the audience was not informed of and thus unable to appreciate "the important characteristics of the picture", referring to the authentic portrayal of Irish rural life.

References

Further reading
 Michel Derrien, Aux origines du cinéma irlandais: Sidney Olcott, le premier oeil, TIR 2013.  
 Denis Condon, Touristic Work and Pleasure: The Kalem Company in Killarney

External links

The Lad From Old Ireland sur Irish Film & TV Research Online
Kalem Company filming in Ireland
 The Lad from Old Ireland website dedicated to Sidney Olcott
Restored film by Trinity College, Dublin at YouTube

1910 films
1910 drama films
American silent short films
Films directed by Sidney Olcott
American black-and-white films
Irish black-and-white films
Kalem Company films
Silent American drama films
Irish drama films
1910 short films
1910s American films